is a district located in southwestern Oshima Subprefecture, Hokkaido, Japan.

As of 2004, the district has an estimated population of 16,068 and a density of 33.45 persons per km2. The total area is 480.32 km2.

Towns
Fukushima
Matsumae

History
1869: With the establishment of provinces and Districts in Hokkaido, Tsugaru District (identical to modern Matsumae Town) and Fukushima District (identical to modern Fukushima Town and Shiriuchi in Kamiiso District) were set up.
1871–1872: Placed under Hirosaki Prefecture and Aomori Prefecture.
1881: Shiriuchi Village and Shōkokuishi (?) Village (小谷石村) (split off from Fukushima Village) transferred to Kamiiso District. The remaining area of Fukushima District and Tsugaru District were merged to form Matsumae District.
1897: Matsumae Subprefecture established containing only Matsumae District.
1903: Matsumae Subprefecture merged with Hakodate Subprefecture (later renamed Oshima Subprefecture).

Geography
The district is located on the southern end of the Matsumae Peninsula. The district includes the two islands in the Tsugaru Strait, Oshima and Kojima.

References

Districts in Hokkaido